Theodorus of Jerusalem, also Theodore was the patriarch of Jerusalem from 760 to 782.

Theodorus saw, during his episcopate, a severe persecution of the Christians and Jews in Palestine by the Muslim ruler Abdallah ibn Ali, who demanded extremely high taxes from Christians and placed harsh restrictions on them: forbidding nocturnal vigils, confiscating sacred vessels, and demanding removal of crosses from all the churches. Abdallah required Christians and Jews to bear distinctive markings. As the leaders of the Christians, the bishops bore the brunt of his harsh actions. These persecutions also forced many Christians to leave Palestine, further changing its social character.

Also, during his episcopate, Theodorus joined with the patriarchs of Alexandria and Antioch in the condemnation of Cosmas, the Bishop of Epiphanius (Hama), who had declared himself to be an iconoclast.

Theodorus died in 782 and was succeeded by Eusebius as patriarch. However, Eusebius himself reposed before the year was over.

References

8th-century patriarchs of Jerusalem
Year of birth unknown
Melkites in the Abbasid Caliphate
Palestine under the Abbasid Caliphate
782 deaths